Antonín Slavíček (16 May 1870 – 1 February 1910) was a Czech Impressionist painter who worked mostly in the area surrounding Kameničky.

Life
In 1887, he entered the Academy of Fine Arts, Prague, where he studied landscape painting with Julius Mařák. His studies were interrupted on several occasions, apparently due to disagreements with Mařák. In October 1899, Professor Mařák died and Slavíček applied to replace him, but was not accepted. The landscape painting speciality was discontinued.

An important friend of his was the art collector August Švagrovský. A large number of his paintings passed from Švagrovský's collection to the museum in Roudnice.

His wife fell seriously ill in 1908, making it necessary to travel to Dubrovnik for treatment, and he broke his arm during their stay there. A long period of recovery followed. He made several attempts to paint with his left hand, but the results were disappointing. Soon after, he shot himself while "in a state of insanity", according to the death certificate. His widow, Bohumila, married a family friend, the painter Herbert Masaryk; son of Tomáš Masaryk.

His son Jan also became a painter, and his son Jiří was a well-known screenwriter and director.

Selected paintings

References

Further reading

 Vítězslav Nezval: Antonín Slavíček, A Great Czech Painter. Artia, Prague (1955)

External links 

Works relating to Antonín Slavíček @ Národní Knihovny ČR (Czech National Library) 
Česká Televize, "Garden Wall" by Slavíček, at the National Gallery: An appreciation by Monika Sybolová

1870 births
1910 deaths
19th-century Czech painters
Czech male painters
Czech Impressionist painters
Artists from Prague
Burials at Olšany Cemetery
1910 suicides
19th-century Czech male artists